Will Harlin Cokeley (born December 6, 1960) is a former professional American football linebacker who played for the Buffalo Bills in 1987.

External links
Pro-Football-Reference

1960 births
Buffalo Bills players
Living people
American football linebackers
People from Topeka, Kansas
Kansas State Wildcats football players
Players of American football from Kansas